Vasudev Datta Morajkar (born 15 September 1925) is an Indian politician and social worker from Goa. He is a former member of the Goa Legislative Assembly, representing the Sanguem Assembly constituency from 1967 to 1977. He was a member of the Maharashtrawadi Gomantak Party.

Positions held
 Councillor of Sanguem Municipality for 5 years 
 Panel of Chairman 1967–68, 1968–69, 1969–70
 Member of the Committee on Petitions 1967–68, 1968–69, 1969–70, 1970–71 and 1971–72
 Member of the Committee on Delegated Legislation 1969–70
 Member of the Committee on Petitions 1970–71

References

Possibly living people
Goan people
People from South Goa district
Indian politicians
Goa, Daman and Diu MLAs 1972–1977
Goa, Daman and Diu MLAs 1967–1972
20th-century Indian politicians